The Bay St. Louis-Waveland School District is a public school district based in Bay St. Louis, Mississippi (USA).

In addition to almost all of Bay St. Louis, the district serves most the city of Waveland. It includes a part of the former Shoreline Park census-designated place.

Schools
Bay High School (Bay St. Louis; Grades 9-12)
Bay-Waveland Middle School (Bay St. Louis; Grades 6-8)
North Bay Elementary School (Bay St. Louis; Grades 3-5)
Waveland Elementary School (Waveland; Grades K-2)

Demographics

2006-07 school year
There were a total of 1,624 students enrolled in the Bay St. Louis-Waveland School District during the 2006–2007 school year. The gender makeup of the district was 50% female and 50% male. The racial makeup of the district was 20.07% African American, 76.23% White, 2.28% Hispanic, 1.29% Asian, and 0.12% Native American. 88.2% of the district's students were eligible to receive free lunch.

Previous school years

Accountability statistics

See also

List of school districts in Mississippi

References

External links
 

Education in Hancock County, Mississippi
School districts in Mississippi